"" (Let us rejoice most heartily) is a hymn tune that originated from Germany in 1623, and which found widespread popularity after The English Hymnal published a 1906 version in strong triple meter with new lyrics. The triumphant melody and repeated "Alleluia" phrases have supported the tune's widespread usage during the Easter season and other festive occasions, especially with the English texts "Ye Watchers and Ye Holy Ones" and "All Creatures of Our God and King".

The tune's first known appearance was in the 1623 hymnal  (Selected Catholic Spiritual Church-Songs) during the Counter-Reformation and the Thirty Years' War, and the oldest published version that still exists is from 1625. The original 1623 hymnal was edited by Friedrich Spee, an influential Jesuit priest, professor, and activist against witch-hunts, who is often credited as the hymn's composer and original lyricist. The English Hymnal of 1906 was edited by Ralph Vaughan Williams, whose arrangement of the hymn has become the standard for English-speaking churches.



Melody
In its original 1623 publication (of which no copies are now known to exist), "Lasst uns erfreuen" consisted of four eight-note text phrases, each immediately followed by a four-note Alleluia phrase, all of which was followed by the final triple-Alleluia refrain. In the earliest surviving copy of the hymn, in a 1625 collection, the hymn was restructured so that before the final refrain the eight-note text phrases occur in two pairs. The 1623 sequence is still common in German-language Catholic hymnals, while the 1625 version is more usual in English-language hymnals.

The verse consists of two repeated musical phrases with matching rhythms ("V", "v"), one using the upper pitches of the major scale and one using the lower pitches, and likewise for the Alleluia refrain ("R", "r"). Schematically, the structure of the original 1623 version can be represented as "vRvR VrVr RRr", and the revised 1625 sequence is "vvRR VVrr RRr", the tune thus achieving a "full and satisfying effect [built] with rare musical economy".

Hymn texts
Below is the first verse from the original German (the 1625 publication, excluding the Alleluias), alongside a half-rhymed, line-by-line English translation that shares the same 88.88 "long meter":

The original hymn still appears in the main German-language Catholic hymnal Gotteslob, with slightly modernized text, and the tune as well in the protestant Evangelisches Gesangbuch (Nr. 514) with a translation by Karl Budde (1929) of Draper's "All Creatures".

Especially since the early 1900s, versions of the tune have been used for many denominations, languages, and hymn texts. Some of these alternate texts are particularly notable, including alphabetically:

 "All Creatures of Our God and King", a paraphrase of Canticle of the Sun – by William Henry Draper, in 1919. 
 Adapted for festival choir, brass, percussion and organ – by John Rutter, published 1974.
 "Creator Spirit, by Whose Aid", a paraphrase of Veni Creator Spiritus – by John Dryden, published 1693.
 "Praise God, from whom all blessings flow", the Common Doxology – by Thomas Ken, written 1674.
 Adapted for the final movement of The Company of Heaven, a cantata – by Benjamin Britten, composed and published in 1937.

References

External links

1623 compositions
17th-century songs
Easter hymns
Catholic hymns in German
Hymn tunes